Maletín is a municipality in Šumperk District in the Olomouc Region of the Czech Republic. It has about 400 inhabitants.

Administrative parts
The municipality is made up of villages of Javoří, Nový Maletín and Starý Maletín.

Notable people
Emilie Schindler (1907–2001), Righteous among the Nations

References

Villages in Šumperk District